Nonsuch was a 32-gun fourth-rate of the English Navy, built by Peter Pett I at Deptford Dockyard and launched in 1646. She was in the Parliamentary force during the English Civil War, then the Commonwealth Navy and was incorporated into the Royal Navy after the Restoration in 1660. During her time in the Commonwealth Navy she partook in the Battles of Krntish Knock, Portland and Gabbard. She was wreck at Gibraltar in 1664.

Nonsuch was the second named ship since it was used for a 44-gun Galleon named Philip and Mary built in 1556, rebuilt in 1584 and renamed Nonpareil, then rebuilt in 1603 and renamed Nonsuch and sold in 1645.

Construction and specifications
She was ordered in December 1645 to be built at Deptford Dockyard under the guidance of Master Shipwright Peter Pett I. She was launched in 1646. Her known dimensions were  keel reported for tonnage, breadth , depth of hold . The tonnage calculation would be  tons. Her actual armament is not recorded in the stated reference, however, is figured to be the same as her sisters. As built she carried 38 guns, probably ten culverins, fourteen demi-culverins, eighteen 6-pounder  and four sakers.

Commissioned service

Service in the English Civil War
She was commissioned in 1646 for service with the Parliamentary forces under Captain William Thomas for service in the Winter Guard through 1647. She was in the Irish Sea in the spring 1647.  Later in 1647 she was under the command of Captain Richard Willoughby serving in the English Channel. She then was assigned to Warwick's Fleet at the Downs in September 1648. She participated in the blockade of Kinsale, Ireland in 1649.

Service in the Commonwealth Navy
In 1650 she was under Captain John Mildmay for service on the west coast then she went to the Mediterranean with Penn's squadron in 1651. At the Battle of Kentish Knock she was a member of Robert Blake's Fleet of sixty-eight ships on 28 September 1652. In late 1652 she came under command of Captain Thomas Penrose. At the Battle off Portland she was a member of Robert Blake's Fleet of eighty-four ships from 18 to 20 February 1653. This British victory secured control over the English Channel. The Dutch lost eight warships and forty merchant vessels. In the Battle of Gabbard she was a member of Blue Squadron, Center Division under the command of Admiral John Lawson, on 2/3 June 1653. The British were victorious on the first day. When Admiral Tromp attempted to reattack on the 3rd he withdrew when a squadron of eighteen ships arrived under the command of Robert Blake. This fight was followed by the Battle of Scheveningen where she was a member of Blue Squadron, Center Division under the command of Admiral John Lawson on 31 July 1653. In 1656/57 she was under Captain John Wooters with Robert Blake's Fleet. In 1660 she was under Captain Ambrose Smith until he died then Captain John Parker on 27 March 1661. He was still in command for the Restoration of Charles II.

Service after the Restoration 1661
With Captain Parker in Command she sail with the Earl of Sandwich's Squadron to Tangiers. She was with Sir John Lambert's squadron in the Mediterranean during the winter of 1661/62. On 19 March 1664 she was under the command of Captain Nicholas Parker with Sir Thomas Allin's squadron in the Mediterranean. Captain Philip Bacon took command on 4 November 1664.

Loss
Nonsuch was wrecked in a storm at Gibraltar on 3 December 1664.

Notes

Citations

References

 Winfield, British Warships in the Age of Sail (1603 – 1714), by Rif Winfield, published by Seaforth Publishing, England © 2009, EPUB 
 Fleet Actions
 1.1 Battle off Dover 19 May 1652
 1.3 Battle of Kentish Knock 28 September 1652
 1.5 Battle off Portland (the 'Three Days Battle') 18 - 20 February 1653
 1.7 Battle of the Gabbard (North Foreland) 2 - 3 June 1653
 1.8 Battle of Scheveningen (off Texel) 31 July 1653
 Chapter 4, The Fourth Rates - 'Small Ships', Vessels acquired from 24 March 1603, 1646 Programme, Nonsuch
 Colledge, Ships of the Royal Navy, by J.J. Colledge, revised and updated by Lt Cdr Ben Warlow and Steve Bush, published by Seaforth Publishing, Barnsley, Great Britain, © 2020, EPUB , (EPUB), Section N (Nonsuch), Section P (Philip and Mary)
 Lavery, The Arming and Fitting of English Ships of War 1800 - 1815, by Brian Lavery, published by US Naval Institute Press (C) 1989, 

Ships built in Woolwich
17th-century ships
1640s ships
Maritime incidents in 1664
Shipwrecks
Ships of the English navy
Ships of the line of the Royal Navy